Peter Goldgruber (born 20 October 1960) is Austrian functionary who served as the first General Secretary of the Ministry of the Interior, he assumed his office after the first Kurz government was sworn. Following the Ibiza affair, Interior Minister Kickl appointed Goldgruber acting Director General for the Public Security.

References 

1960 births
Living people
Independent politicians